Mahmoud Saad El-Din Ahmed (born 3 March 1952) is an Egyptian former football player and manager. He previously coached Zamalek SC, as well as the Egypt national olympic team at the 1992 Summer Olympics.

Honours

Player
Zamalek
 Egyptian Premier League: 1977–78
 Egypt Cup: 1975, 1977, 1979

References 

Zamalek SC players
Egyptian footballers
Egyptian expatriate football managers
Expatriate football managers in Lebanon
Egyptian expatriate sportspeople in Lebanon
Lebanon national football team managers
Expatriate footballers in Lebanon
Egyptian football managers
Zamalek SC managers
Living people
1952 births
Egyptian Premier League players
Association football defenders
Safa SC players
Egyptian expatriate footballers
Lebanese Premier League players